is a Japanese television drama consisting of eleven episodes, which aired on the Tokyo Broadcasting System from October 13 to December 22, 2005.

Premise
The program centers on a mother and three sons, living together and supporting one another since their father died when they were young; much of the plot centers around their romances, and various situations at work and at home. It is something of a reworking or revival of the 1995 TV drama Second Chance, which had much the same premise of a mother working at a supermarket and living with her three sons; Misako Tanaka stars in both shows as the mother. Though the rest of the characters and cast are different, and Brother Beat is not intended to carry on the same plot as a true sequel, there are a number of connections and references to Second Chance. For example, in this show Tanaka plays Harue Sakurai, where in Second Chance her character's name was Haruko Sakurai; Hidekazu Akai plays the husband or chief love interest of Tanaka's character in both shows, though that character's name and role differ. In many parts of Japan, the full run of Second Chance was re-aired in 2005 preceding the premiere of Brother Beat.

Though the plot of this series was meant to involve the development of a relationship between Harue and Hideki Noguchi, played by Katsuhisa Namase, ending in their marriage, Namase's schedule interfered with this. However, it was arranged that the two would play the main character's parents in a 2006 TV drama called 14-year-old Mother.

Cast
Harue Sakurai - Misako Tanaka (mother, works at a supermarket)
Tsutomu Sakurai - Hidekazu Akai (father, dies when his sons are young)
Tatsuya Sakurai - Tetsuji Tamayama (oldest brother, works as a salaryman)
Child Tatsuya - Yūki Izumisawa
Riku Sakurai - Mokomichi Hayami (middle brother, swim instructor at a gym)
Child Riku - Ryōhei Hirota
Junpei Sakurai - Akiyoshi Nakao (youngest brother, college student)
Hideki Noguchi - Katsuhisa Namase (Harue's manager at the supermarket; main love interest for her)
Chisato Tamura - Ryoko Kuninaka (works at the supermarket with Harue; main love interest for Tatsuya)
Ai Kudō - Reina Asami
Miyuki Aizawa - Mayuko Iwasa
Section Chief Yamaguchi - Akio Kaneda (Tatsuya's boss)
Azuma - Hideo Tsubota
Yoshii - Hiro Mizushima
Saori Tsukahara - Minami Ōtomo
Yumiko Toda - Miyako Takeuchi
Megumi Nomura - Hiroko Yamashita
Kyōko Nishihara - Naoko Miya
Keiko - Kazusa Matsuda
Aki & Rie Yoshihara - Aya Okamoto
Morimura - Tomoharu Hasegawa
Miyuki Aizawa's father - Kenichi Yajima
Fusako Tamura - Kyōko Uemura (Chisato's mother)
Shōgo Tamura - Takuzō Kadono (Chisato's father)
Kei Tamura - Hideo Ishiguro (Chisato's younger brother)

Staff
Writer - Eriko Komatsu
Directors - Kanji Takenoshita, Shin Katō, Jun Mutō
Producer - Hitohiro Itō
Broadcaster - Tokyo Broadcasting System
Music - Def Tech (main themes "Broken Hearts" and "My Way")

External links

Official Site (Japanese)

Japanese drama television series
TBS Television (Japan) dramas
2005 Japanese television series debuts
2005 Japanese television series endings